American singer Whitney Houston released 57 singles as a lead artist, 4 as a featured artist and 18 promotional singles. Nicknamed ''The Voice", she has sold more physical singles in the United States than any other female solo artist in history, according to the Recording Industry Association of America. In the United States, Houston amassed 11 Billboard Hot 100 number one singles, all of which have been certified gold, platinum, multi-platinum or diamond by the Recording Industry Association of America.

After signing with Arista Records in 1983 at the age of nineteen, Houston's first single, "Hold Me", was released in 1984. That song was followed up in early 1985 by her first solo Billboard Hot 100 entry, "You Give Good Love", which went to number three on the chart. Her first number one single was "Saving All My Love for You", which was the third single released from her debut album. Following "Saving All My Love for You", Houston would release a back-to-back string of consecutive number one singles ("How Will I Know", "Greatest Love of All", "I Wanna Dance with Somebody (Who Loves Me)", "Didn't We Almost Have It All", "So Emotional" and "Where Do Broken Hearts Go"). Following the latter's peak at number one, Houston set an all-time record for most consecutive number one singles with seven, besting the previous record first set by The Beatles in the 1960s and later matched a decade later by the Bee Gees. Houston's debut album was the first album to launch more than three number one singles, while her 1987 follow-up, Whitney, was the first female album to launch four number one singles.

Following the success of the number one US dance single, "Love Will Save the Day" and the 1988 Olympics theme song, "One Moment in Time", which hit number one on the US Adult Contemporary chart, the UK and Germany, Houston went towards an R&B direction with her third album, 1990's I'm Your Baby Tonight, which launched three top ten singles ("I'm Your Baby Tonight", "All the Man That I Need" and "Miracle") with the former two singles topping the Billboard Hot 100. With that feat, Houston became the first artist in recording history to launch three or more top ten singles off their first three albums as well as the first and only artist in history to launch multiple number one singles off their first three albums. In the middle of promoting the I'm Your Baby Tonight album, Houston performed the Star Spangled Banner at Super Bowl XXV in 1991. Following the critically-acclaimed performance, fans began requesting for the song on radio. As a result, Arista Records issued the recording as a single and it became the first time since the history of the Hot 100 in which a singer had charted with the national anthem, taking it to the top twenty, where it immediately went gold.

Houston's first soundtrack, 1992's The Bodyguard, launched three top five singles, including the number one smash, "I Will Always Love You", and the top five singles, "I'm Every Woman" and "I Have Nothing". "I Will Always Love You" is the best-selling physical single of all time by a female artist and was Diamond certified. "I Will Always Love You" stayed atop the Billboard Hot 100 for a then-record setting 14 weeks. Shared with Mariah Carey's "We Belong Together", it remains the longest running number one single by a female solo artist. It continues to hold the record for most consecutive weeks at number one by a solo artist, shared with Elton John's "Candle in the Wind '97" and the most consecutive weeks by a solo black artist and a female solo artist. "Run to You", the fourth and final single from the soundtrack, peaked inside the top 40 while a house remix of "Queen of the Night", later topped the US Hot Dance Club Songs chart.

In 1995, Houston's single, "Exhale (Shoop Shoop)", from the soundtrack to her film, Waiting to Exhale, became only the third single in history to debut at number one on the Hot 100, followed by the top ten single, "Count On Me" and the top 30 single, "Why Does It Hurt So Bad". When her ballad, "I Believe in You and Me", debuted inside the top ten of the Billboard Hot 100 in 1996, Houston joined Janet Jackson, Michael Jackson and Mariah Carey to have two or more singles debut inside the top ten. In 1998, Whitney released her first studio album in eight years, My Love is Your Love. The album launched five top forty singles on the Billboard Hot 100, including three top ten singles ("Heartbreak Hotel", "It's Not Right but It's Okay" and "My Love Is Your Love"). Four of the singles, including "I Learned from the Best", all topped the Dance Club Songs chart. When "My Love is Your Love" peaked at number four in January 2000, it made her the first artist who debuted in the 1980s to have had top ten singles in three consecutive decades. In 2000, Houston released her first compilation, Whitney: The Greatest Hits, which spawned a couple of European smash hit singles, including the Enrique Iglesias duet, "Could I Have This Kiss Forever", which topped the European Hot 100 Singles chart, her fifth career number one. The same track reached number 52 on the Billboard Hot 100 and number ten on the Dance Club Songs chart, while the Deborah Cox duet, "Same Script, Different Cast", reached number 70 on the Hot 100 and number three on the dance chart.

Following the September 11 attacks in 2001, Houston re-issued "The Star-Spangled Banner" with its sales donated to charities. The song would give Houston her 23rd and final top ten single of her lifetime, reaching number six on the Hot 100. The Houston rendition would later be certified platinum by the RIAA. Her 2002 studio album, Just Whitney, launched four charted singles on various Billboard charts, with the most successful of these singles being "One of Those Days", which reached number 72 on the Billboard Hot 100 and number 29 on the US Hot R&B/Hip-Hop Songs chart and number one on the US Adult R&B Songs chart, and "Try It On My Own", which peaked at number ten on the Hot Adult Contemporary Songs chart. Three of the singles on the album also reached number one on the Hot Dance Club Songs chart. Her first and only Christmas-themed album, One Wish: The Holiday Album (2003), produced the top twenty adult contemporary charted single, "One Wish (For Christmas)", continuing her success on the adult contemporary charts. After a six-year sabbatical, Houston returned with her final studio album, 2009's I Look to You, which launched two Billboard Hot 100 charted singles, including the multi-charted title track, and the dance single, "Million Dollar Bill", which peaked at number one on the Dance Club Songs chart and Adult R&B Songs chart.

Following her death in 2012, Houston returned to the top ten of the Billboard Hot 100 for the first time in a decade when her 1992 number-one hit, "I Will Always Love You", peaked at number three, making her one of a few artists to land a top ten single in four decades, joining Barbra Streisand, Madonna and Cher. Her 1987 single, "I Wanna Dance with Somebody (Who Loves Me)", also re-entered the top 40 of the Billboard Hot 100 at number 25 as did her 1986 single, "Greatest Love of All", which reached number 36. Not too long afterwards, her label RCA Records released the posthumous single, "Celebrate", which gave the singer her 45th entry in the R&B charts. In 2019, Houston returned to several international charts after dance remix producer Kygo released a remixed version of Houston's 1990 cover of the song "Higher Love". The song would reach number one on the US dance singles chart and number two on the UK Singles Chart, while also giving Houston her first new posthumous entry on the Billboard Hot 100 where it peaked at number 63, her highest-charted single there since "Could I Have This Kiss Forever". Following its peak at number one on the Hot Dance Club Songs chart, Houston became only one of three artists to have number one songs on the chart in four consecutive decades after Madonna and Janet Jackson. The single would later be certified double platinum in the United States and the United Kingdom.

Singles

1980s

1990s

2000s

2010s (Posthumous releases)

2020s (Posthumous releases)

Chart re-entries

Featured singles

Promotional singles

Other charted songs

Notes

References

External links 
 Official website
 [ Billboard chart history]
 UK chart database
 German chart database
 The British Phonographic Industry (BPI) sales certificate database
 Recording Industry Association of America (RIAA) sales certificate database
 Rock on the net.com
 Whitney Houston' photos and music
 
 

Discographies of American artists
Pop music discographies
Rhythm and blues discographies
Soul music discographies